P. V. K. N. Government College (or Papudesi Venkata Krishnama Naidu Government College), Chittoor, Andhra Pradesh was established in 1961 and recognized by the University Grants Commission in 1966. It is the leading college in Chittoor district, affiliated to Sri Venkateswara University. It offers undergraduate and postgraduate courses in Arts, Sciences and Commerce.

The college is affiliated with NAAC-A grade.

References 

Colleges in Andhra Pradesh
Universities and colleges in Chittoor district
Chittoor
Educational institutions established in 1961
1961 establishments in Andhra Pradesh